Flagenium is a genus of flowering plants in the family Rubiaceae. The genus is endemic to Madagascar.

Species
Flagenium farafanganense 
Flagenium latifolium 
Flagenium pedunculatum 
Flagenium petrikense 
Flagenium setosum 
Flagenium triflorum

References

Rubiaceae genera
Taxa named by Henri Ernest Baillon
Octotropideae